Methven Junction railway station opened in 1866, following the extension of the already existing Perth, Almond Valley and Methven Railway line which terminated in the village of Methven to the north.  This new line, operated by the Crieff and Methven Junction Railway continued westwards from this junction through Balgowan, Madderty, Abercairney, Innerpeffray and finally, Crieff. Following the closure of Methven Station on 27 September 1937, Methven Junction was renamed 'Methven Junction Halt' until its own closure as a passenger station on 1 October 1951.

See also 

 List of closed railway stations in Britain

References

External links
 Disused stations

Disused railway stations in Perth and Kinross
Railway stations in Great Britain opened in 1866
Railway stations in Great Britain closed in 1951
Former Caledonian Railway stations